Siny Yar (Kök-Ĵar) is a rural locality (a selo) in Ust-Koksinsky District, the Altai Republic, Russia. The population was 6 as of 2016. There is 1 street.

Geography 
Siny Yar is located 16 km west of Ust-Koksa (the district's administrative centre) by road. Tyuguryuk is the nearest rural locality.

References 

Rural localities in Ust-Koksinsky District